Alive in Tulsa is the third album and the first live album by the band Axium, and features David Cook (vocals, guitar); Bobby Kerr (drums); Ryan Butler (bass); and Jeff Shrout (guitar). It was recorded by Mike Russell on February 14, 2004 at "the Venue" and mastered by Ben Hosterman.

Track listing

Axium albums
2004 live albums